The Interlachen Bridge is a reinforced concrete arch bridge on William Berry Parkway between Bde Maka Ska and Lake Harriet in Minneapolis, Minnesota.  The bridge crosses the Como-Harriet Streetcar Line, a heritage streetcar line operated by the Minnesota Streetcar Museum which follows the same right-of-way as the original Twin Cities Rapid Transit line of the same name. The bridge was designed by local builder William S. Hewett. The bridge is one of the most significant bridges in Minnesota because it is the earliest known extant concrete bridge with a documented construction date.  The bridge was listed on the National Register of Historic Places on November 6, 1989, as part of the Reinforced-Concrete Highway Bridges in Minnesota MPS.

The Interlachen Bridge was based on the Melan reinforcing system, invented by Viennese engineer Josef Melan and patented in the United States in 1894.

References

National Register of Historic Places in Minneapolis
Bridges in Minneapolis
Bridges completed in 1900
Road bridges on the National Register of Historic Places in Minnesota
Concrete bridges in Minnesota
Arch bridges in the United States